The 2011–12 CONCACAF Champions League Championship Round was played from March to April 2012. A total of eight teams qualified for the Championship Round: the four group winners and the four group runners-up from the Group Stage.

The draw for the Championship Round was held on November 8, 2011, at the CONCACAF headquarters in New York City. In the quarter-finals, the group winners were assured of playing the second leg at home, and were drawn against the group runners-up, with the only restriction being that they could not face the same team that they played in the Group Stage (and thus they could face a team from the same association).

The championship round was played in knockout format. Each tie was played over two legs, and the away goals rule was used, but not after a tie entered extra time; a penalty shoot-out was thus used if the aggregate score was level after extra time.

Qualified teams

Bracket

Quarter-finals
The first legs of the quarter-finals were played March 6–8, 2012, and the second legs were played March 13–15, 2012.

|}

First leg: All Times U.S. Eastern Standard Time (UTC−05:00); Second leg: All Times U.S. Eastern Daylight Time (UTC−04:00)

First leg

Notes
Note 1: Match was played at Rogers Centre instead of BMO Field, the home stadium of Toronto FC, due to the unpredictability of March's weather conditions, and the stadium was not "winterized".

Second leg

Monterrey won 7–2 on aggregate.

Santos Laguna won 7–3 on aggregate.

Toronto FC won 4–3 on aggregate.

UNAM won 9–2 on aggregate.

Semi-finals
The first legs of the semi-finals were played March 28, 2012, and the second legs were played April 4, 2012.

|}

All Times U.S. Eastern Daylight Time (UTC−04:00)

First leg

Second leg

Santos Laguna won 7–3 on aggregate.

Monterrey won 4–1 on aggregate.

Final

The first leg of the final was played April 18, 2012, and the second leg was played April 25, 2012.

|}

All Times U.S. Eastern Daylight Time (UTC−04:00)

First leg

Second leg

Monterrey won 3–2 on aggregate.

References

External links
 CONCACAF Champions League official website

Championship Round